Hemibarbus umbrifer is a species of small freshwater fish in the family Cyprinidae. It is endemic to the Xi River in China.

References

 

Hemibarbus
Fish described in 1931